Muang Trang United Football Club (Thai สโมสรฟุตบอล เมืองตรัง ยูไนเต็ด), is a Thai football club based in Mueang, Trang, Thailand. The club is currently playing in the Thai League 3 Southern region.

History
In early 2022, the club was established and competed in Thailand Amateur League Southern region, using the Trang Municipality Stadium as the ground. At the end of the season, the club could be promoted to the Thai League 3 as the Thailand Amateur League runners-up. They use the Trang Municipality Stadium as a ground to compete for the T3 in the 2022–23 season.

In late 2022, Muang Trang United competed in the Thai League 3 for the 2022–23 season. It is their first season in the professional league. The club started the season with a 0–1 away defeated to Phuket Andaman and they ended the season with a 2–1 home win over the Phuket Andaman. The club has finished seventh place in the league of the Southern region. In addition, in the 2022–23 Thai League Cup Muang Trang United was defeated 0–1 by Songkhla in the second qualification round, causing them to be eliminated.

Stadium and locations

Season by season record

P = Played
W = Games won
D = Games drawn
L = Games lost
F = Goals for
A = Goals against
Pts = Points
Pos = Final position

QR1 = First Qualifying Round
QR2 = Second Qualifying Round
R1 = Round 1
R2 = Round 2
R3 = Round 3
R4 = Round 4

R5 = Round 5
R6 = Round 6
QF = Quarter-finals
SF = Semi-finals
RU = Runners-up
W = Winners

Players

Current squad

Honours

Domestic competitions

League
 Thailand Amateur League
 Runners-up (1): 2022

References

External links
 Thai League official website
 Club's info from Thai League official website

Association football clubs established in 2022
Football clubs in Thailand
Trang province
2022 establishments in Thailand